A bio-based material is a material intentionally made from substances derived from living (or once-living) organisms. These materials are sometimes referred to as biomaterials, but this word also has another meaning. Strictly the definition could include many common materials such as wood and leather, but it typically refers to modern materials that have undergone more extensive processing. Unprocessed materials may be called biotic material. Bio-based materials or biomaterials fall under the broader category of bioproducts or bio-based products which includes materials, chemicals and energy derived from renewable biological resources.

Bio-based materials are often biodegradable, but this is not always the case.

Examples include:
 cellulose fibers – fibers made from reconstituted cellulose.
 casein – a phosphoprotein extracted from milk during the process of creating low fat milk, it is processed in various ways to make: plastic, dietary supplements for body builders, glue, cotton candy, protective coatings, paints, and occurs naturally in cheese, giving it a creamy texture.
 polylactic acid – a polymer produced by industrial fermentation
 bioplastics – include a soy oil based plastic now being used to make body panels for John Deere tractors
 engineered wood – products such as oriented strand board and particle board
 zein – a natural biopolymer which is the most abundant corn protein 
 Corn_starch – the starch of the maize grain, used to make packing pellets
 Grease – lubricants made from vegetable oils, including soybean oil, that can replace petroleum based lubricants

References

Biomaterials
Green chemistry